Tom Kibble (born 3 June 2000 in Australia) is an Australian rugby union player who plays for the Queensland Reds in Super Rugby. His playing position is flanker. He has signed for the Reds squad in 2020.

Reference list

External links
Rugby.com.au profile
itsrugby.co.uk profile

2000 births
Australian rugby union players
Living people
Rugby union flankers
Queensland Country (NRC team) players
Queensland Reds players